is a private junior college in Fukuoka, Fukuoka, Japan. The school was originally established as a women's college in 1957. In 2007 it became coeducational.

Alumni 
Kie Kusakabe, judo-ka

External links
 Official website

Japanese junior colleges
Educational institutions established in 1957
Private universities and colleges in Japan
Universities and colleges in Fukuoka Prefecture
1957 establishments in Japan